Savannah Rose Marshall (born 19 May 1991) is a British professional boxer who  held the WBO female middleweight title between 2020 and 2022. As an amateur, she became the first British female world champion after securing gold at the 2012 World Championships. She has been nicknamed as the 'Silent Assassin' due to her shyness and her multiple knockout wins. As of October 2022, she is ranked as the world's second best active female middleweight by BoxRec and by The Ring.

Early life
Marshall is from Hartlepool in the North East of England. She attended the English Martyrs School, where she achieved 12 GCSEs before gaining a Distinction in a BTEC National Diploma in Sport at Hartlepool College.

She began boxing aged 12, when she joined a local Hartlepool Headland club after seeing a boy showing off his trophy on the street and decided she wanted one. She went to her local boxing club with two of her girl friends however her friends only went once and decided not to go back. The club had no girls training at this time and had constantly tried to discourage Marshall. She stated that she thinks the trainer looked at her as 'an annoying little girl who kept on coming back' but she was determined, having fallen in love with the sport.  They learned to accept her and began to support her.

She sparred with the boys at her club. However, when going to other gyms to get sparring partners, it was a struggle. A head trainer of one gym pointed at Savannah and said "what's that?  She is not sparring here" and Savannah had to sit and watch the session. Savannah describes herself as very competitive and wants to win at everything and is constantly in competition with training partner Hughie Fury.

Amateur career
Following her win in China at the 2012 AIBA Women's World Boxing Championships in Qinhuangdao, China, Marshall was a favourite to win gold at the 2012 London Olympics. However, she was defeated 16–12 by Marina Volnova of Kazakhstan in her opening, quarter-final bout with many feeling the occasion and expectation was too much for her to handle at the time.

Marshall remains the only boxer ever to have defeated Claressa Shields, the middleweight women's gold medallist in the 2012 Olympics; the bout took place in the second round of the 2012 AIBA Women's World Boxing Championships in Qinhuangdao.

At the 2014 Commonwealth Games in Glasgow, Marshall beat Ariane Fortin of Canada to take the gold medal in the women's middleweight division.
In May 2016, Marshall qualified for the 2016 Rio Olympics, after reaching the semi-finals of the 2016 AIBA Women's World Boxing Championships in Kazakhstan.

Professional career
Marshall has stated she went through “a dark time in 2016” when she lost after a controversial decision at the Rio Olympics. But Floyd Mayweather had spotted her obvious talent and was quick to sign her as a professional.

On 18 May 2017, during a press conference to promote the IBF junior-lightweight title defence of Mayweather promoted Gervonta Davis against former British champion Liam Walsh, Floyd Mayweather Jr. announced to the press that he had signed Marshall to a professional promotional contract. Marshall made her professional boxing debut at super-middleweight on the undercard of The Money Fight, in the professional boxing super-fight between undefeated five-division champion Floyd Mayweather Jr. and the former UFC Lightweight Champion and Featherweight Champion Conor McGregor. It took place at the T-Mobile Arena in Paradise, Nevada on 26 August 2017. She defeated Sydney LeBlanc by unanimous decision 40–36 in a four-round bout.
Marshall lifted the vacant WBA super-middleweight Inter-continental title in Sofia, Bulgaria, after winning all 10 rounds to claim a comfortable points victory over Yanina Orozco (Argentina).

A couple of weeks after her pro debut in Las Vegas, Marshall decided to split from Mayweather Promotions, however said she had left on good terms. On her return to the UK Marshall linked up with Hennessey Sport and went back to training with Peter Fury, uncle of Tyson Fury, who had previously trained her leading up to her first professional fight in Las Vegas.

On 31 October 2020 in her 9th professional fight Marshall became the WBO female middleweight champion with a TKO victory over opponent Hannah Rankin at Wembley Arena.  "There were times when I thought, 'When will my chance come?' But tonight it did and I grabbed it with both hands", she told Sky Sports.

Marshall was initially scheduled to face Claressa Shields in a title unification bout on September 10, 2022. However, due to the death of Queen Elizabeth II the bout was postponed to take place on October 15, 2022. Marshall lost the fight via unanimous decision with two judges scoring the fight 97–93 and one scoring it 96–94, all in favour of Shields to become the undisputed middleweight world champion. This fight occurred at the O2 Arena and was the first time two female boxers headlined at a major venue in the United Kingdom. As well, the fight headlined the first all-female boxing card in the United Kingdom.

Professional boxing record

References

External links

1991 births
Living people
English women boxers
Middleweight boxers
Super-middleweight boxers
Boxers at the 2012 Summer Olympics
Boxers at the 2016 Summer Olympics
Olympic boxers of Great Britain
Boxers at the 2014 Commonwealth Games
Commonwealth Games gold medallists for England
Sportspeople from Hartlepool
People educated at English Martyrs School and Sixth Form College
AIBA Women's World Boxing Championships medalists
Boxers at the 2015 European Games
Commonwealth Games medallists in boxing
European Games competitors for Great Britain
World middleweight boxing champions
World Boxing Organization champions
Medallists at the 2014 Commonwealth Games